María Isabel Díaz Lago (born 4 July 1964) is a Cuban actress. A graduate of the Instituto Superior de Arte, her first film role was in Una novia para David. She became the first Cuban "Almodóvar girl", appearing in the 2006 film Volver. On the small screen, she is best known for her role as Soledad "Sole" Núñez Hurtado on Locked Up. She has resided in Spain since 1996.

Biography
María Isabel Díaz Lago was born in Havana on 4 July 1964. During her pre-university studies, she joined the school's theater group and participated in various theater festivals. She also appeared in a play by the Bertolt Brecht Group, Rampa arriba, rampa abajo.

In 1982, she began attending the Instituto Superior de Arte, and the same year she was cast in the play La Rueda de Casino, directed by Armando Suárez del Villar. She also auditioned for the opera Donde crezca el amor. Despite her young age, she was offered the character of the mother, a role in which she acted and sang under the musical direction of baritone Hugo Marcos and the general direction of Armando Suárez del Villar. The opera premiered in the Avellaneda room of the National Theatre of Cuba, and had a long run.

While still attending school, she was selected to star in the film Una novia para David, a script by Senel Paz directed by Orlando Rojas. Alternating her incipient film career with schoolwork under the supervision of teacher , she premiered La Historia de un Caballo and Galileo Galilei with the Teatro Estudio group at the Hubert de Blanck theater.

As a fresh graduate in 1987, she made some appearances on telenovelas and a primetime variety show. From that point on, she alternated work in theater (in plays such as Al que le toco le tocó, Sibila mi amor, and La querida de enramada), films (such as Hello Hemingway, Papeles Secundarios, El plano, Melodrama, and ), and television series (such as Por amor, Damasco rojo, and La pícara cocinera).

In addition, from 2003 to 2006, she participated in the staging of Real Women Have Curves with the Basque company Ados Teatroa, touring throughout Spain, and with two seasons in Madrid and Barcelona.

Other films in which she appeared were Radio Love, La Mala, Masala, Un rey en la Habana, Tres años en el paraíso, Frutas en el café, Stones, Las noches de Constantinopla, Apocalypto, and The Argentine, the latter directed by Steven Soderbergh and starring Benicio del Toro. She also participated in Holy Camp!, directed by Javier Calvo and Javier Ambrossi, released in 2017.

For from 2010 to 2015, she lived in Miami and was part of the "couch team" of the Ana María Polo program Caso Cerrado.

Her career got a major boost when she was cast in the popular prison drama Locked Up, playing Sole, one of the main inmates.

Awards
María Isabel Díaz Lago was named Best Actress in a Feature Film at the 2013 Miami Life Awards for Neuralgia.

For her role on Locked Up, she received an Ondas Award for Best Female Performance (along with the rest of the female cast) in 2015, and in 2017 she was nominated for Best Supporting Actress at the Spanish Actors Union Awards. In 2020, she received an award at the Filming Italy Sardenga Festival.

Roles

Film

References

External links
 

1964 births
21st-century Cuban actresses
Actresses from Havana
Cuban expatriates in Spain
Cuban film actresses
Cuban stage actresses
Cuban telenovela actresses
Living people